Alvaro Valera Muñoz-Vargas (born 16 October 1986 in Seville) table tennis player from Spain.

Personal 
In 2012, he lived in Madrid. In 2013, he was awarded the silver Real Orden al Mérito Deportivo.

Table tennis 
He played table tennis at the 2000, 2004, 2008 and 2012 Summer Paralympics. He won a gold medal in Sydney in 2000, the only gold medal in table tennis in Spanish Paralympic history. In 2008, he finished third in the Class 7 men's singles.

In London 2012, he finished second in the Class 6 men's singles and in the team class 6–8 event.

References

External links 
 

1982 births
Living people
Spanish male table tennis players
Paralympic table tennis players of Spain
Paralympic medalists in table tennis
Paralympic gold medalists for Spain
Paralympic silver medalists for Spain
Paralympic bronze medalists for Spain
Table tennis players at the 2000 Summer Paralympics
Table tennis players at the 2004 Summer Paralympics
Table tennis players at the 2008 Summer Paralympics
Table tennis players at the 2012 Summer Paralympics
Table tennis players at the 2016 Summer Paralympics
Medalists at the 2000 Summer Paralympics
Medalists at the 2008 Summer Paralympics
Medalists at the 2012 Summer Paralympics
Medalists at the 2016 Summer Paralympics
Sportspeople from Seville
Table tennis players at the 2020 Summer Paralympics